Gubernatorial elections in 2001 took place in 17 regions of the Russian Federation. 16 regular and one extraordinary campaigns took place that year. In two regions the second rounds were held in January 2002.

With some delay, elections were held for the governors of Nenets and Taymyr Autonomous Okrugs, whose terms of office expired back in December 2000. Early elections were held in Primorsky Krai after resignation of Yevgeny Nazdratenko.

On 1 December 2001 Fatherland – All Russia party (OVR), founded and supported by a number of influential governors, officially merged with pro-Putin Unity into United Russia. For the some time after it was known as "Unity and Fatherland — United Russia". Previously that year members of these two center-right parties had occasionally met each other in different gubernatorial races.

Race summary

Notes

References

Gubernatorial elections in Russia
2001 elections in Russia